Prior to the amendment of Tamil Nadu Entertainments Tax Act 1939 on 22 July 2006, Gross was 115 per cent of Nett for all films. Post-amendment, Gross equalled Nett for films with pure Tamil titles. Commercial Taxes Department disclosed 15.41 crore in entertainment tax revenue for the year.

This is a list of films released in 2010.

List of released films

January — March

April — June

July – September

October — December

Awards

Notable deaths

References

Films, Tamil
2010
Lists of 2010 films by country or language
2010s Tamil-language films